The Finland Prize is a literary award presented annually by the Swedish Academy since 1966. It is awarded to somebody that has done important activities for the Swedish-speaking culture in Finland. The amount was 100,000 crowns in 2007.

Recipients

 1966 – Hagar Olsson
 1967 – Rabbe Enckell
 1968 – Georg Henrik von Wright
 1969 – Tito Colliander
 1970 – Solveig von Schoultz
 1971 – Bo Carpelan
 1972 – Tove Jansson
 1973 – Rabbe Enckell
 1974 – Olof Enckell
 1975 – Erik Ekelund
 1976 – Christer Kihlman
 1977 – Olav Ahlbäck
 1978 – Johannes Salminen
 1979 – Erik Tawaststjerna
 1980 – Lars Huldén
 1981 – Göran Schildt
 1982 – Oscar Nikula
 1983 – Erik Stenius
 1984 – Carl-Eric Thors
 1985 – Erik Allardt
 1986 – Torsten Steinby
 1987 – Kai Laitinen
 1988 – Claes Andersson
 1989 – Matti Klinge
 1990 – Ulla-Lena Lundberg
 1991 – Johan Wrede
 1992 – Tua Forsström
 1993 – Jan-Magnus Jansson
 1994 – Max Engman
 1995 – Clas Zilliacus
 1996 – Valdemar Nyman
 1997 – Kari Tarkiainen
 1998 – Mikael Enckell
 1999 – Ralf Långbacka
 2000 – Finsk Tidskrift
 2001 – Thomas Warburton
 2002 – Märta Tikkanen
 2003 – Tuva Korsström
 2004 – Jörn Donner
 2005 – Peter Sandelin
 2006 – Rainer Knapas
 2007 – Henrik Meinander
 2008 – Christer Kihlman
 2009 – Nils Erik Forsgård
 2010 – Ann Sandelin
 2011 – Gösta Ågren
 2012 – Pär Stenbäck
 2013 – Gunvor Kronman
 2014 – Michel Ekman
 2015 – Mikael Reuter
 2016 – Fred Karlsson
 2017 – Paavo Lipponen
 2018 – Kjell Westö
 2019 – Marika Tandefelt

References 

Swedish Academy
Awards established in 1966
Literary awards honoring writers
Nordic literary awards
Swedish literary awards
Swedish-speaking population of Finland